Nightstand is the fourth studio album by American musician Tancred. It was released in June 2018 under Polyvinyl Record Co.

Track listing

References

2018 albums
Polyvinyl Record Co. albums